A progressive tax is a tax in which the tax rate increases as the taxable amount increases. The term progressive refers to the way the tax rate progresses from low to high, with the result that a taxpayer's average tax rate is less than the person's marginal tax rate. The term can be applied to individual taxes or to a tax system as a whole. Progressive taxes are imposed in an attempt to reduce the tax incidence of people with a lower ability to pay, as such taxes shift the incidence increasingly to those with a higher ability-to-pay. The opposite of a progressive tax is a regressive tax, such as a sales tax, where the poor pay a larger proportion of their income compared to the rich.

The term is frequently applied in reference to personal income taxes, in which people with lower income pay a lower percentage of that income in tax than do those with higher income. It can also apply to adjustments of the tax base by using tax exemptions, tax credits, or selective taxation that creates progressive distribution effects. For example, a wealth or property tax, a sales tax on luxury goods, or the exemption of sales taxes on basic necessities, may be described as having progressive effects as it increases the tax burden of higher income families and reduces it on lower income families.

Progressive taxation is often suggested as a way to mitigate the societal ills associated with higher income inequality, as the tax structure reduces inequality, but economists disagree on the tax policy's economic and long-term effects. One study suggests progressive taxation can be positively associated with happiness, the subjective well-being of nations and citizen satisfaction with public goods, such as education and transportation.

Early examples
In the early days of the Roman Republic, public taxes consisted of assessments on owned wealth and property. For Roman citizens, the tax rate under normal circumstances was 1% of property value, and could sometimes climb as high as 3% in situations such as war. These taxes were levied against land, homes and other real estate, slaves, animals, personal items and monetary wealth. By 167 BC, Rome no longer needed to levy a tax against its citizens in the Italian peninsula, due to the riches acquired from conquered provinces. After considerable Roman expansion in the 1st century, Augustus Caesar introduced a wealth tax of about 1% and a flat poll tax on each adult; this made the tax system less progressive, as it no longer only taxed wealth. In India under the Mughal Empire, the Dahsala system was introduced in A.D. 1580 under the reign of Akbar. This system was introduced by Akbar's finance minister, Raja Todar Mal, who was appointed in A.D. 1573 in Gujarat. The Dahsala system is a land-revenue system (system of taxation) which helped to make the collecting system be organised on the basis of land fertility.

Modern era

The first modern income tax was introduced in Great Britain by Prime Minister William Pitt the Younger in his budget of December 1798, to pay for weapons and equipment for the French Revolutionary War. Pitt's new graduated (progressive) income tax began at a levy of 2 old pence in the pound ( or 0.83%) on annual incomes over £60 and increased up to a maximum of 2 shillings (10%) on incomes of over £200. Pitt hoped that the new income tax would raise £10 million, but actual receipts for 1799 totalled just over £6 million.

Pitt's progressive income tax was levied from 1799 to 1802 when it was abolished by Henry Addington during the Peace of Amiens. Addington had taken over as prime minister in 1801, after Pitt's resignation over Catholic emancipation. The income tax was reintroduced by Addington in 1803 when hostilities recommenced, but it was again abolished in 1816, one year after the Battle of Waterloo.

The present form of income tax in the United Kingdom was reintroduced by Sir Robert Peel in the Income Tax Act 1842. Peel, as a Conservative, had opposed income tax in the 1841 general election, but a growing budget deficit required a new source of funds. The new income tax, based on Addington's model, was imposed on incomes above £150. Although this measure was initially intended to be temporary, it soon became a fixture of the British taxation system. A committee was formed in 1851 under Joseph Hume to investigate the matter but failed to reach a clear recommendation. Despite the vociferous objection, William Gladstone, Chancellor of the Exchequer from 1852, kept the progressive income tax, and extended it to cover the costs of the Crimean War. By the 1860s, the progressive tax had become a grudgingly accepted element of the English fiscal system.

In the United States, the first progressive income tax was established by the Revenue Act of 1862. The act was signed into law by President Abraham Lincoln, and replaced the Revenue Act of 1861, which had imposed a flat income tax of 3% on annual incomes above $800. The Sixteenth Amendment to the United States Constitution, adopted in 1913, permitted Congress to levy all income taxes without any apportionment requirement. By the mid-20th century, most countries had implemented some form of progressive income tax.

Measuring progressivity
Indices such as the Suits index, Gini coefficient, Kakwani index, Theil index, Atkinson index, and Hoover index have been created to measure the progressivity of taxation, using measures derived from income distribution and wealth distribution.

Marginal and effective tax rates

The rate of tax can be expressed in two different ways; the marginal rate expressed as the rate on each additional unit of income or expenditure (or last dollar spent) and the effective (average) rate expressed as the total tax paid divided by total income or expenditure. In most progressive tax systems, both rates will rise as the amount subject to taxation rises, though there may be ranges where the marginal rate will be constant. Usually, the average tax rate of a taxpayer will be lower than the marginal tax rate. In a system with refundable tax credits, or income-tested welfare benefits, it is possible for marginal rates to fall as income rises, at lower levels of income.

Inflation and tax brackets
Tax laws might not be accurately indexed to inflation. For example, some tax laws may ignore inflation completely. In a progressive tax system, failure to index the brackets to inflation will eventually result in effective tax increases (if inflation is sustained), as inflation in wages will increase individual income and move individuals into higher tax brackets with higher percentage rates. This phenomenon is known as bracket creep and can cause fiscal drag.

Economic effects
There is debate between politicians and economists over the role of tax policy in mitigating or exacerbating wealth inequality and the effects on economic growth.

Income equality

Progressive taxation has a direct effect on decreasing income inequality. This is especially true if taxation is used to fund progressive government spending such as transfer payments and social safety nets. However, the effect may be muted if the higher rates cause increased tax evasion. When income inequality is low, aggregate demand will be relatively high, because more people who want ordinary consumer goods and services will be able to afford them, while the labor force will not be as relatively monopolized by the wealthy. 
High levels of income inequality can have negative effects on long-term economic growth, employment, and class conflict. Progressive taxation is often suggested as a way to mitigate the societal ills associated with higher income inequality. The difference between the Gini index for an income distribution before taxation and the Gini index after taxation is an indicator for the effects of such taxation.

The economists Thomas Piketty and Emmanuel Saez wrote that decreased progressiveness in US tax policy in the post World War II era has increased income inequality by enabling the wealthy greater access to capital.

According to economist Robert H. Frank, tax cuts for the wealthy are largely spent on positional goods such as larger houses and more expensive cars. Frank argues that these funds could instead pay for things like improving public education and conducting medical research, and suggests progressive taxation as an instrument for attacking positional externalities.

Economic growth
A report published by the OECD in 2008 presented empirical research showing a weak negative relationship between the progressivity of personal income taxes and economic growth. Describing the research, William McBride, a staff writer with the conservative Tax Foundation, stated that progressivity of income taxes can undermine investment, risk-taking, entrepreneurship, and productivity because high-income earners tend to do much of the saving, investing, risk-taking, and high-productivity labor. According to IMF, some advanced economies could increase progressivity in taxation for tackling inequality, without hampering growth, as long as progressivity is not excessive. Fund also states that the average top income tax rate for OECD member countries fell from 62 percent in 1981 to 35 percent in 2015, and that in addition, tax systems are less progressive than indicated by the statutory rates, because wealthy individuals have more access to tax relief.

Educational attainment

Economist Gary Becker has described educational attainment as the root of economic mobility. Progressive tax rates, while raising taxes on high income, have the goal and corresponding effect of reducing the burden on low income, improving income equality. Educational attainment is often conditional on cost and family income, which for the poor, reduces their opportunity for educational attainment. Increases in income for the poor and economic equality reduces the inequality of educational attainment. Tax policy can also include progressive features that provide tax incentives for education, such as tax credits and tax exemptions for scholarships and grants.

A potentially adverse effect of progressive tax schedules is that they may reduce the incentives for educational attainment. By reducing the after-tax income of highly educated workers, progressive taxes can reduce the incentives for citizens to attain education, thereby lowering the overall level of human capital in an economy. However, this effect can be mitigated by an education subsidy funded by the progressive tax. Theoretically, public support for government spending on higher education increases when taxation is progressive, especially when income distribution is unequal.

Psychological factors

A 2011 study psychologists Shigehiro Oishi, Ulrich Schimmack, and Ed Diener, using data from 54 countries, found that progressive taxation was positively associated with the subjective well-being, while overall tax rates and government spending were not. The authors added, "We found that the association between more-progressive taxation and higher levels of subjective well-being was mediated by citizens’ satisfaction with public goods, such as education and public transportation." Tax law professor Thomas D. Griffith, summarizing research on human happiness, has argued that because inequality in a society significantly reduces happiness, a progressive tax structure which redistributes income would increase welfare and happiness in a society. Since progressive taxation reduces the income of high earners and is often used as a method to fund government social programs for low income earners, calls for increasing tax progressivity have sometimes been labeled as envy or class warfare, while others may describe such actions as fair or a form of social justice.

Computation

There are two common ways of computing a progressive tax, corresponding to point–slope form and slope–intercept form of the equation for the applicable bracket. These compute the tax either as the tax on the bottom amount of the bracket plus the tax on the marginal amount within the bracket; or the tax on the entire amount (at the marginal rate), minus the amount that this overstates tax on the bottom end of the bracket.

The tax on $25,000 of income could then be computed two ways. Using point–slope form (tax on bottom amount plus tax on marginal amount) yields:

Geometrically, the line for tax on the top bracket passes through the point  and has a slope of 0.3 (30%).

Geometrically, the line for tax on the top bracket intercepts the y-axis at −$3,000 – it passes through the point  – and has a slope of 0.3 (30%).

In the United States, the first form was used through 2003, for example (for the 2003 15% Single bracket):
 If the amount on Form 1040, line 40 [Taxable Income], is: Over— 7,000
 But not over— 28,400
 Enter on Form 1040, line 41 [Tax] $700.00 + 15%
 of the amount over— 7,000
From 2004, this changed to the second form, for example (for the 2004 28% Single bracket):
 Taxable income. If line 42 is— At least  but not over 
 (a) Enter the amount from line 42
 (b) Multiplication amount × 28% (.28)
 (c) Multiply (a) by (b)
 (d) Subtraction amount 
 Tax. Subtract (d) from (c). Enter the result here and on Form 1040, line 43

Examples

Most systems around the world contain progressive aspects. When taxable income falls within a particular tax bracket, the individual pays the listed percentage of tax on each dollar that falls within that monetary range. For example, a person in the U.S. who earned  US of taxable income (income after adjustments, deductions, and exemptions) would be liable for 10% of each dollar earned from the 1st dollar to the 7,550th dollar, and then for 15% of each dollar earned from the 7,551st dollar to the 10,000th dollar, for a total of .50.

In the United States, there are seven income tax brackets ranging from 10% to 39.6% above an untaxed level of income based on the personal exemption and usually various other tax exemptions, such as the Earned Income Tax Credit and home mortgage payments. The US federal tax system also includes deductions for state and local taxes for lower income households which mitigates what are sometimes regressive taxes, particularly property taxes. In order to counteract regressive state and local taxes, many US states implement progressive income taxes. 32 states and the District of Columbia have graduated-rate income taxes. The brackets differ across states. 

There has been a hefty decline in progressivity of the United States federal tax system since the 1960s. The two periods with the largest tax progressivity reductions occurred under the Reagan administration in the 1980s and the Bush administration in the 2000s. The Tax Cuts and Jobs Act of 2017 implemented by President Trump greatly affected the United States tax system, making it much less progressive than it once was. The act took steps to dramatically lower taxes for high-income households, open deduction loopholes for businesses, and cut the federal corporate tax rate down to 21 percent. It maintained the structure of seven tax brackets for personal income, but lowered five of the seven by one percent or more.

Belgium has the following personal income tax rates (for the income year 2021): 25% from EUR€0 to €13,540; 40% from €13,540 to €23,900; 45% from €23,900 to €41,360; and 50% from €41,360 and any amount over.

Denmark has the following state tax rates regarding personal income: 12.11% for the bottom tax base; 15% for the top tax base, or income exceeding DKK 544,800. Additional taxes, such as the municipal tax (which has a country average of 24.971%), the labour market tax, and the church tax, are also applied to individual’s income.

Germany has the following personal income tax rates for a single taxpayer (for the 2020 tax year): 0% up to EUR€9,744; 14-42% from €9,744 to €57,918; 42% from €57,918 to €274,612; and 45% for €274,612 and any amount over.

Norway has the following personal income tax rates (for the year 2020): 1.9% from NOK180,800 to NOK254,500; 4.2% from NOK254,500 to NOK639,750; 13.2% from NOK639,750 to NOK999,550; and 16.2% from NOK999,550 and above.

Sweden has the following state income tax brackets for natural persons: 0% on income up to SEK 413,200; 20% from SEK 413,200 to SEK 591,600; and 25% from SEK 591,600 and any amount over.

The United Kingdom has the following income tax rates: 0% from GBP£0 to £12,570; 20% from £12,571 to £50,270; 40% from £50,271 to £150,000; and 45% from £150,000 and over. In Scotland, however, there are more tax brackets than in other UK countries. Scotland has the following additional income tax brackets: 19% from £12,571 to £14,667; 20% from £14,667 to £25,296; 21% from £25,297 to £43,662; 41% from £43,663 to £150,000; and 46% for any amount over £150,000.

All values are in New Zealand dollars and exclude the earner levy.

See also

References
 
68. ^"https://www.jagranjosh.com/general-knowledge/dahsala-system-1408960979-1"

External links

 The Progressive Income Tax: Theoretical Foundations
  

Taxation and redistribution
Tax incidence
Tax terms
Economic progressivism